Mathieu Gonçalves (born 8 June 2001) is a French professional footballer who plays as a defender for Swiss club Xamax.

Career
Gonçalves joined the Toulouse FC academy at U15 level, and signed his first professional contract with the club in June 2018. He made his professional debut for Toulouse in a 4–0 Ligue 1 loss to Paris Saint-Germain F.C. on 25 August 2019.

On 30 September 2020 Gonçalves joined Championnat National side Le Mans FC on loan until the end of the 2020–21 season.

On 8 July 2021, he signed a two-year contract with Xamax in Switzerland.

Personal life
Born in France, Gonçalves is of Portuguese descent.

References

External links
 
 
 
 
 Toulouse Profile

2001 births
Footballers from Paris
French people of Portuguese descent
Living people
French footballers
France youth international footballers
Association football defenders
Toulouse FC players
Le Mans FC players
Neuchâtel Xamax FCS players
Ligue 1 players
Ligue 2 players
Championnat National 3 players
Championnat National players
Swiss Challenge League players
French expatriate footballers
Expatriate footballers in Switzerland
French expatriate sportspeople in Switzerland